Ken Jennings (born 1974) is an American game show contestant.

Ken Jennings or Kenneth Jennings may also refer to:

 Ken Jennings (actor) (born 1947), American actor
 Kenneth Jennings (conductor) (1925–2015), American choral conductor and composer
 Kenneth Jennings (cricketer) (born 1953), South African cricketer
 Kenneth Jennings (priest) (1930–2007), Dean of Gloucester